Marivan County is in Kurdistan province, Iran. The capital of the county is the city of Marivan. Marivan County is bordered by Saqqez County to the north, Sanandaj County to the east and southeast, Paveh County to the south, and Iraq to the west and northwest. At the 2006 census, the county's population was 150,926 in 35,498 households. The following census in 2011 counted 168,774 people in 44,258 households. At the 2016 census, the county's population was 195,263 in 55,603 households. Of these, 151,188 lived in urban centres while 44,075 lived in rural regions; 99,956 were male and 95,307 were female. The county is the third most populous in Kurdistan province.

Administrative divisions
Until 1958 the county was known as Marivan District and was one of the districts of Sanandaj County. At that time, Kalatrazan District, Sarvabad County, and Sarshiv District were parts of Marivan District. The population history and structural changes of Marivan County's administrative divisions over three consecutive censuses are shown in the following table. The latest census shows three districts, six rural districts, and four cities.

References

 

Counties of Kurdistan Province